In number theory, a sublime number is a positive integer which has a perfect number of positive factors  (including itself), and whose positive factors add up to another perfect number.

The number 12, for example, is a sublime number.  It has a perfect number of positive factors (6): 1, 2, 3, 4, 6, and 12, and the sum of these is again a perfect number: 1 + 2 + 3 + 4 + 6 + 12 = 28.

There are only two known sublime numbers: 12 and (2126)(261 − 1)(231 − 1)(219 − 1)(27 − 1)(25 − 1)(23 − 1)  . The second of these has 76 decimal digits:
6,086,555,670,238,378,989,670,371,734,243,169,622,657,830,773,351,885,970,528,324,860,512,791,691,264.

References 

Divisor function
Integer sequences